Boris Klemenić is a former mayor of Jastrebarsko, a city in the Croatian Zagreb County, and a member of the sixth assembly of the Croatian Parliament. The mayor of the city Jastrebarsko was elected in two terms, first in Jun 2001, and second in May 2005. He is affiliated with the Croatian Peasant Party (HSS). He formed part of the parliament following new elections in 2007, but he officially became a member on January 12, 2008 as the deputy of Božidar Pankretić.

References 

1964 births
Living people
Mayors of places in Croatia
Croatian Peasant Party politicians
Representatives in the modern Croatian Parliament